Centrarchiformes  is an obsolete order of ray-finned fish, now included amongst the perciformes, with 17 previously included families. This order first appeared about 55.8 million years ago in the Eocene Era, and is composed primarily of omnivores. The order has a wide range that includes the continents of Australia and South America. Many Centrarchiformes look essentially perch-like, featuring a stocky build and a spine-bearing dorsal fin, and range in size from 2.5 cm in length (for Elassoma gilberti), to 1.8 meters for the Maccullochella peelii. The order Centrachiformes is not recognized in the 5th Edition of Fishes of the World.

Previously included families

 Aplodactylidae
 Centrarchidae
 Cheilodactylidae
 Chironemidae
 Cirrhitidae
 Dichistiidae
 Elassomatidae (likely belong within Centrarchidae)
 Enoplosidae
 Girellidae
 Kuhliidae
 Kyphosidae
 Latridae
 Oplegnathidae
 Percalatidae
 Percichthyidae
 Perciliidae
 Sinipercidae
 Terapontidae

References 

Obsolete vertebrate taxa